Panamanian Spanish is the Spanish (Castilian) language as spoken in the country of Panama. It is closely related to other varieties of Caribbean Spanish.

The variations among different speaker groups of the same language can be lexical (vocabulary), phonological (pronunciation), morphological (word forms), or in the use of syntax (grammar).

Historically, Panama and Colombia were part of the same political entity. Colombia, governed from the Real Audiencia of Panama during the 16th century, then part of Castilla de Oro, with its capital in Panama, during the 17th century, and after independence from Spain, Panama voluntarily became part of the Republic of Gran Colombia along with Venezuela and Ecuador, with its capital in Bogota. From the colonial times and periods and also during most of the 19th century and until 1903, and even though there are still lexical similarities shared by the two countries (e.g., pelao in both Colombia and Panama means "kid" or "child"), phonetically, Panamanian Spanish is very similar with the Spanish as spoken in the coastal areas around the Caribbean, specifically Cuba, Puerto Rico, the Dominican Republic and the Caribbean coasts of Colombia and Venezuela.

Phonology 
The aspiration is also observed in the coastal regions of Peru and Ecuador; in Chile, Argentina, and Uruguay; and in Andalusia and the Canary Islands of Spain.

As in many other varieties, word-final  is often velarized in Panamanian Spanish. Word-final  is more often elided on the Costa Arriba of Colón Province, east of the city of Colón, than in Panama City.

It is found primarily among less-educated speakers, but it can sometimes be observed among better-educated speakers, as in Andalusian Spanish. The [] sound is also typical in dialects of Cuba, north Mexico, and Chile, the latter is where this sound is also more stigmatized among less-educated speakers.

As in most of the Spanish-speaking world, word-final  is typically deleted in informal Panamanian Spanish.

The trilled R is often pronounced with a preceding  sound.

Throughout rural Panama, as in much of the rest of the Spanish-speaking world,  is usually pronounced as a voiceless bilabial fricative, that is, with both of the lips rather than with the bottom lip and the upper teeth.

In much of rural Panama, but not in the Costa Arriba of Colón Province east of Colón, word-initial h is actually pronounced in several words such as  'deep' or  'fed up'. This is related to the historical aspiration and eventual loss of Latin f in Spanish. In a few areas, this  kept being pronounced in some words.

In at least the Costa Arriba,  is quite strong, often being pronounced as an affricate, and almost never being elided.

Syllable-final  are often elided. Syllable-final  is often converted to a simple aspirate , while  may be backed to a velar fricative .

The  is realized as glottal , as in Caribbean and other American Spanish dialects, Canarian, and Andalusian Spanish dialects.

Grammar 
Rural Panamanian Spanish has a few grammatical forms which are often considered to be archaisms. These were once more common, but have fallen into disuse in 'standard' Spanish. Also,  'any' can be used as an adjective, as in  'anyone', and the term  'some other' is still used. Rural western Panama has more forms considered archaic.

Vocabulary 
Lexically, Panamanian Spanish presents a variety of new terms introduced and being incorporated into the daily language all the time. The following quotation shows some common Panamanian expressions:
"Vecina, yo no soy vidajena, y no me gusta esa vaina ... pero te voy a contar un bochinche... 
pero si me das de comer un poco de chicheme, concolón, carimañola, sancocho y mondongo....
Ese man flacuchento y ñato vestido de guayabera azul y sombrero montuno que viene allí ... Su motete ya no tiene ñame, guineo ni guandú. Lo que tiene es un pocotón de chécheres. Según la comadre fula radiobemba, el cambio en ese laopé no se debe a una macuá ..."

[Note: laopé = pelao ("boy") (vesre)]

Panamanians sometimes use loanwords from English, partly due to the prolonged existence of the Panama Canal Zone. Examples are breaker (from circuit breaker) instead of the Spanish interruptor, switch (from light switch) instead of the Spanish interruptor, fren (from friend) instead of Spanish amigo or amiga (this term is used in a unisex way), ok (from okay) instead of the Spanish vale, and so on. Many of these quotes and phrases are based in the Macaronic language presented in Panamanian slang.

References

Bibliography

Further reading 
Alba, Orlando (1992): "El español del Caribe: unidad frente a diversidad dialectal" Revista de Filología Espaňola,72, 525–540.
 Alvarado de Ricord, Elsie: El español de Panamá; estudio fonético y fonológico. Panama, 1971.
 Banse, Timoteo, Panamanian Spanish Slang: Words and Phrases .
 Giralt Latorre, Javier (1991): "Algunos préstamos en el español de Panamá". Estudios de Lingüística de la Universidad de Alicante, 7, 137–158. 
 Broce, Marlene y Torres Cacoullos, Rena (2002): "'Dialectología urbana' rural: la estratificación social de (r) y (l) en Coclé, Panamá". Hispania, 85/2, 342–354. 
 Quilis, Antonio y Graell Stanziola, M. (1992): "La lengua española en Panamá". Revista de Filología Española, 72/3–4, 583–638. 
 Cedergren, Henrietta J. (1978): "En torno a la variación de la /S/ final de sílaba en Panamá: análisis cuantitativo", en López Morales, Humberto (ed.), Corrientes actuales en la dialectología del Caribe hispánico, Río Piedras, Universidad de Puerto Rico, 80–103.
 Cedergren, Henrietta J.; Rousseau, Pascale y Sankoff, David (1986): "La variabilidad de /r/ implosiva en el español de Panamá y los modelos de ordenación de reglas", en Núñez Cedeño, R., I. Páez Urdaneta y L. Guitart (eds.), Estudios sobre la fonología del español del Caribe, Caracas, Ediciones La Casa de Bello, 13–20. 
 Graell Stanziola, M. y Quilis, Antonio (1991): "Datos sobre la lengua española en Panamá", en Hernández Alonso, C. y otros (eds.), Actas del III Congreso Internacional de 'El Español de América', 2, Valladolid, Junta de Castilla y León, 997–1005. 

 Malmberg, B. 1965. Estructura silábica del español. Estudios de Fonética Hispánica, Madrid: C.S.I.C.
 Quesada Pacheco, Miguel A. 1996. El español de América Central. En Manual de dialectología hispánica. El español de América, ed. Manuel Alvar. 101–115. Barcelona: Ariel.

External links 
 Jerga Panameña
en Wikcionario

Central American Spanish
Languages of Panama
Panama–Spain relations